One World Publications may refer to:

 Oneworld Publications, an independent British publisher
 One World, an imprint of Random House